"The Road Less Traveled" is the fifth episode in the fourth season of the re-imagined Battlestar Galactica. It first aired on television on May 2, 2008. The survivor count shown in the title sequence is 39,676.  It is the only episode of the entire series in which Bill Adama does not appear, and the first of two episodes not to feature Laura Roslin. It is also the final episode in which Number Six is absent.

Plot
The episode begins aboard Demetrius, now 58 days into the mission to find Earth. Helo reports to Captain Starbuck and reminds her that the time is near to rendezvous back with the fleet. Starbuck concentrates intently on a star chart of a sector Helo states they have explored twice already. She tells him that she has a feeling that the "third time's a charm" and that she will scout the sector herself.

On Galactica, Gaius Baltar continues to preach his monotheistic beliefs. He hears a woman's story of the loss of her family during the Cylon sneak attack and her anger that the Gods stood by and let it happen. Baltar tells her that the Gods didn't aid them because they do not exist and humanity has been pandering to their own ignorance. Meanwhile, in his quarters, Galen Tyrol listens to Baltar's rhetoric over a radio while he exercises.

In space, Starbuck and her wingman Hot Dog head out to explore the sector. Soon, DRADIS picks up an incoming Cylon Heavy Raider. Starbuck intercepts the craft which is heavily damaged and spinning out of control. Suddenly, she hears the voice of Leoben Conoy over the communications channel who tells Starbuck that he has found her and it is time to complete her journey. Leoben is brought aboard Demetrius where he tells Starbuck that she needs the help of his fellow Cylons and that she needs to go to the Hybrid; it will give her the answers she seeks. Instead of locking him up, Starbuck has him taken to her quarters.

On Galactica, Tory finds Tyrol standing in the Viper launch tube obsessing about Cally's "accident". Tory tells him that she was emotionally disturbed, but Tyrol says she would have never left their son Nicholas behind. Tory suggests Cally sensed Tyrol was a Cylon, and was afraid of him. She says whatever the reason, it was part of God's divine plan and speaks of Baltar's preachings. Vexed, Tyrol states she has been spending too much time with Baltar.

On Demetrius, Anders returns from a recon flight and finds Leoben with Starbuck, guiding her hand in painting her mural - his other hand on her hip. Anders furiously rips Leoben away from her and Starbuck protests the intrusion. As the guards take Leoben away, Helo steps in and reminds Starbuck of the months of mind-games that Leoben played on her back on New Caprica, but she argues that Leoben can help find Earth.

Meanwhile, Anders roughs up Leoben and demands to know what he wants from Starbuck. Leoben says he just wants her to understand her destiny, just as Anders himself is looking for his own moment of clarity. Anders pulls a gun but Leoben says if he dies, Starbuck's dream dies with him and explains there won't be a resurrection this time. Leoben informs him of the war among the Cylons, between those who embrace their nature and those who fear it. He proposes an alliance between his faction and the fleet. The hybrid can lead Starbuck to righteousness and together they can find the promised land. Anders scoffs at the notion and leaves.

Afterward, Anders tells the others of Leoben's proposal which causes more animosity amongst the crew who want to return to the fleet. Everyone, including Athena, believes Starbuck is being brainwashed by the Cylon and he will only lead them into a trap. Helo tries to silence any talk of mutiny, but the antagonism grows more intense. Starbuck appears, apparently overhearing the others, and tells Helo to retrieve the navigation computer from Leoben's Raider.

Back on Galactica, Baltar discusses with Tory the effects his movement is having on President Roslin and the Quorum. Although he is attracting more followers, the leaders consider them of little consequence.

Tyrol attends Baltar's next sermon where Colonel Tigh arrives and pulls him aside. Tigh strongly suggests that Tyrol get over Cally and return to duty, but Tyrol takes offense saying it's not as easy for him to bury his dead wife as Tigh had buried Ellen. He also brings up Tigh's continual visits to Caprica Six. Tigh tells him that he is not ashamed of anything he has done. He can live with all of his choices, but Tyrol says he himself can't.

On Demetrius, Sergeant Erin Mathias goes out in a space suit to check for tracking devices on the docked Raider, but the ship suddenly explodes and Mathias is flung into space.

On Galactica, Tyrol attends another sermon by Baltar; as he leaves, Baltar calls out to him – to set their differences aside and take his hand for Cally. Tyrol tells Baltar that Cally may have forgiven him but there are some sins that even God won't forgive. Instead of taking Baltar's hand, Tyrol violently chokes him. Baltar's followers pull Tyrol away while he furiously shouts that Baltar didn't know Cally. Tyrol then enters his quarters and furiously trashes the room. He pulls out a gun and points it at his head shouting in despair. He then tearfully breaks down.

On Demetrius, Starbuck accuses Leoben of blowing up his raider and strikes him bloody. He swears it was a malfunction but then tells Starbuck to finish him off promising he won't be resurrected this time. Starbuck relents and asks what happened the two months she was missing – the visions of her mother she had, what does it all mean? Leoben says she has to make peace with the ghosts of her past as they are obstacles that are keeping her from realizing her destiny. He tells her that he sees her as an angel blazing with God's glory and waiting to lead her people on.

Starbuck meets with her crew to honor Mathias. She blames herself for the loss, but they have to complete the mission. She orders Helo to set course to rendezvous with Leoben's Basestar. When she leaves, Lieutenant Pike refuses to follow Starbuck any further and demands Helo take charge of the situation. Pike refuses to stand down, and Helo knocks him to the deck.

On Galactica, against the warnings of his followers, Baltar pays a visit to Tyrol's quarters. He finds Tyrol lying awake in his bunk with the gun on his hip. Baltar nervously apologizes for his intrusion and says he is truly sorry for Cally's loss. He admits to having done unconscionable crimes but he seems to have been given another chance for redemption and begs Tyrol for  forgiveness. As Baltar leaves, Tyrol holds out his hand in friendship and Baltar eagerly accepts it.

On Demetrius Starbuck enters the bridge and issues an order to Helo to prepare for a jump to the coordinates of the Basestar. All eyes fall on Helo as he swallows hard and tells Starbuck he cannot put the crew at risk. Starbuck relieves him and appoints Mr. Gaeta as the new XO, but he also refuses to follow her command. Starbuck narrows her eyes as Helo asserts his authority to relieve her of command.

External links
 "The Road Less Traveled" at Battlestar Wiki
 "The Road Less Traveled" at Syfy
 

2008 American television episodes
Battlestar Galactica (season 4) episodes